Gufunes is a historical estate and park for sculptures and artwork in northeastern Reykjavík. Today it lies within the Grafarvogur part of the city, located to the southwest and south of the Eidsvik Cove and Geldinganes Headland. It contains some 25 sculptures by Hallsteinn Sigurðsson amongst others.

In 2016 an urban design competition  has been organized for the future of the Gufunes industry and landscape. jvantspijker and Felixx with Orri Steinarsson won the competition.

References

External links

Official site
History

Buildings and structures in Reykjavík
Parks in Iceland
Art museums and galleries in Iceland
Tourist attractions in Iceland
Tourist attractions in Reykjavík
Sculpture gardens, trails and parks in Europe